Watson Lake is an electoral district which returns a member (known as an MLA) to the Legislative Assembly of the Yukon Territory in Canada. The riding is one of the Yukon's eight rural ridings and is one of the oldest ridings in the Yukon.

Watson Lake includes the communities of Watson Lake and Upper Liard and is situated on the traditional territory of the Ross River Dena Council and the Liard First Nation of the Kaska Dena. It is bordered to the west by the rural riding of Pelly-Nisutlin.

It is considered a Yukon Party stronghold.

Members of the Territorial Council / Legislative Assembly

Electoral results

2021 general election

The Yukon NDP nominated candidate Amy Labonte. Two days after the close of nominations, following controversy over past social media posts, Labonte withdrew her candidacy on March 24, 2021. Watson Lake became the only electoral district in the Yukon without an NDP candidate. For the first time since 1970, Watson Lake had only two candidates on the ballot.

2016 general election

|-

|-

| NDP
| Erin Labonte
| align="right"| 219
| align="right"| 28.5%
| align="right"| -4.6%
|-

| Liberal
| Ernie Jamieson
| align="right"| 212
| align="right"| 27.6%
| align="right"| +5.0%
|-

| Independent
| Victor Kisoun
| align="right"| 38
| align="right"| 5.0%
| align="right"| -1.6%
|-
! align=left colspan=3|Total
! align=right| 768
! align=right| 100.0%
! align=right| –
|}

2011 general election

|-

|-

| NDP
| Liard McMillan
| align="right"| 242
| align="right"| 33.1%
| align="right"| +27.3%
|-

| Liberal
| Thomas Slager
| align="right"| 165
| align="right"| 22.6%
| align="right"| -3.0%
|-

| Independent
| Patricia Gilhooly
| align="right"| 48
| align="right"| 6.6%
| align="right"| +6.6%
|-
! align=left colspan=3|Total
! align=right| 731
! align=right| 100.0%
! align=right| –
|}

2006 general election 

|-

|-

| Liberal
| Rick Harder
| align="right"|196
| align="right"|25.6%
| align="right"|+4.4%
|-

| NDP
| Rachael Lewis
| align="right"|45
| align="right"|5.8%
| align="right"|-10.0%
|-

| Independent
| Dale Robert Worsfold
| align="right"|28
| align="right"|3.6%
| align="right"|+3.6%
|-
! align=left colspan=3|Total
! align=right| 764
! align=right| 100.0%
! align=right| –
|}

2002 general election

|-

|-

| Liberal
| Tom Cove
| align="right"|174
| align="right"|21.1%
| align="right"|-10.9%
|-

| NDP
| Kathy Magun
| align="right"|130
| align="right"|15.8%
| align="right"|-35.3%
|-
! align=left colspan=3|Total
! align=right| 825
! align=right| 100.0%
! align=right| –
|}

2000 general election

|-

| NDP
| Dennis Fentie
| align="right"|434
| align="right"|51.1%
| align="right"|-1.7%
|-

| Liberal
| Isaac Wood
| align="right"|272
| align="right"|32.0%
| align="right"|+19.3%
|-

|-
! align=left colspan=3|Total
! align=right| 850
! align=right| 100.0%
! align=right| –
|}

1996 general election

|-

| NDP
| Dennis Fentie
| align="right"|442
| align="right"|52.8%
| align="right"|+18.3%

| Liberal
| Dave Kalles
| align="right"|106
| align="right"|12.7%
| align="right"|+5.9%
|-

| Independent
| Mickey Thomas
| align="right"|40
| align="right"|4.8%
| align="right"|+4.8%
|-
! align=left colspan=3|Total
! align=right| 837
! align=right| 100.0%
! align=right| –
|}

1992 general election

|-

|-

| NDP
| Karel Kauppinen
| align="right"| 285
| align="right"| 34.5%
| align="right"| -10.2%
|-

| Liberal
| Ron Lutz
| align="right"| 56
| align="right"| 6.8%
| align="right"| -2.7%
|-
! align=left colspan=3|Total
! align=right| 826
! align=right| 100.0%
! align=right| –
|}
The Yukon Progressive Conservative Party re-branded itself as the Yukon Party before the 1992 election.

1989 general election

|-

|-

| NDP
| Karel Kauppinen
| align="right"| 295
| align="right"| 44.7%
| align="right"| +11.5%
|-

| Liberal
| John McDonald
| align="right"| 63
| align="right"| 9.5%
| align="right"| +9.5%
|-
! align=left colspan=3|Total
! align=right| 660
! align=right| 100.0%
! align=right| –
|}

1985 general election

|-

| NDP
| Dave Porter
| align="right"| 183
| align="right"| 33.2%
| align="right"| +29.9%
|-

| Independent
| Donald Taylor
| align="right"| 174
| align="right"| 30.6%
| align="right"| -0.4%
|-

| Independent
| Brian Shanahan
| align="right"| 119
| align="right"| 21.0%
| align="right"| -8.1%
|-

|-
! align=left colspan=3|Total
! align=right| 568
! align=right| 100.0%
! align=right| –
|}

1982 general election

|-

| Independent
| Donald Taylor
| align="right"| 170
| align="right"| 31.0%
| align="right"| +31.0%
|-

| Independent
| Brian Shanahan
| align="right"| 154
| align="right"| 28.1%
| align="right"| +28.1%
|-

|-

| Liberal
| Eileen Van Bibber
| align="right"| 60
| align="right"| 10.9%
| align="right"| -34.9%
|-

| NDP
| James Cahill
| align="right"| 18
| align="right"| 3.3%
| align="right"| +3.3%
|-
! align=left colspan=3|Total
! align=right| 548
! align=right| 100.0%
! align=right| –
|}

1978 general election

|-

|-

| Liberal
| Grant Taylor
| align="right"| 188
| align="right"| 44.9%
| align="right"| –
|-
! align=left colspan=3|Total
! align=right| 419
! align=right| 100.0%
! align=right| –
|}
Partisan politics introduced into the territory

1974 general election

|-

| Independent
| Donald Taylor
| align="right"| 223
| align="right"| 49.6%
| align="right"| –
|-

| Independent
| Johnny Friend
| align="right"| 110
| align="right"| 24.4%
| align="right"| –
|-

| Independent
| Harold Godfrey
| align="right"| 107
| align="right"| 23.8%
| align="right"| –
|-
! align=left colspan=3|Total
! align=right| 450
! align=right| 100.0%
! align=right| –
|}

1970 general election

|-

| Independent
| Donald Taylor
| align="right"| 397
| align="right"| 58.0%
| align="right"| –
|-

| Independent
| R.W. Stubenberg
| align="right"| 275
| align="right"| 40.2%
| align="right"| –
|-
! align=left colspan=3|Total
! align=right| 684
! align=right| 100.0%
! align=right| –
|}

References 

Watson Lake - Yukon Votes 2006. Retrieved May 22, 2009.

Yukon territorial electoral districts